Zeina is a feminine given name. It is one of the variants that include Zina, Zena and the feminine version of the male given name Zein. 

Zeina may refer to:

People

Zeina
Zeina (actress) (born 1977), Egyptian actress and model
Zeina Abirached (born 1981), Lebanese illustrator, graphic novelist and comic artist
Zeina Akar (born c. 1964), Lebanese politician and social scientist
Zeina Talal Arslan, an Emira, the wife of Lebanese politician Emir Talal Arslan
Zeina Awad, Lebanese news correspondent
Zeina Hashem Beck, Lebanese poet
Zeina Daccache, Lebanese actress and director
Zeina Khodr, Lebanese broadcast journalist 
Zeina Mickawy (born 1998), Egyptian squash player
Zeina Mina (born 1963), Lebanese Olympic athlete
Zeina Nassar, German boxer of Lebanese descent
Zeina Shaban (born 1988), Jordanian table tennis player
Zeina Soufan, Lebanese journalist and television host
Zeina el Tibi, French–Lebanese journalist 
Zeina Yazigi, Syrian journalist, reporter and television news anchor

Zeïna
Zeïna Sahelí (born 1983), Senegalese swimmer

Others
Tevragh-Zeina, Mauritanea
FC Tevragh-Zeina, Mauritanean football club based in the Tevragh-Zeina

See also
Zina (given name)
Zena (given name)
Zein (disambiguation)